Bhavani is a state assembly constituency in Erode district in Tamil Nadu. Its State Assembly Constituency number is 104. It is one of the 234 State Legislative Assembly Constituencies in Tamil Nadu, in India.

It covers Bhavani and some parts of Erode City.

It is included in Erode Parliamentary Constituency.

Demographics
The constituency has a significant number of Kongu Vellalar Gounder, Vanniyar and Senguntha Mudaliar, Reddiyar and Adi Dravida communities.

Madras State

Tamil Nadu

Election Results

2021

2016

2011

2006

2001

1996

1991

1989

1984

1980

1977

1971

1967

1962

1957

1952

References 

 

Assembly constituencies of Tamil Nadu
Erode district